Julian Burroughs Hatton III is an American landscape abstract artist from New York City. The New York Times described his painting style as "vibrant, playful, semi-abstract landscapes" while New York Sun art critic John Goodrich compared him to French painter Bonnard. Hatton's abstract landscapes have been compared to paintings by Arthur Dove and Georgia O'Keeffe because of his "unbridled love of pure, hot color" similar to Gauguin and the Fauves, according to critic Ann Landi of ARTnews. Hatton's vision is of "a nature that you can literally eat with your eyes, eye candy transposed onto the entire world," according to critic Joel Silverstein.

Early years

Hatton was born in Grand Haven, Michigan. The cold Michigan climate and cold flat landscape influenced his sense of color, he recalled later. He graduated from Phillips Academy in Andover, Massachusetts in 1974-the school's first co–educational class. Hatton graduated from Harvard University in 1979 with a major in art history. Painting in the north of France helped him develop his understanding of color and landscape. His first application to the Studio School in New York was rejected since he lacked a portfolio. He studied with painter Fernando Zobel in Spain, returned with a portfolio, and was accepted. He enrolled at the New York Studio School of Drawing, Painting and Sculpture from 1980 to 1982. After school, Hatton worked at the Water Club restaurant in Manhattan for eight years.
Later Hatton worked with decorative painters, painting interiors of apartments and restaurants, while living in SoHo.

Career
Hatton exhibited at Manhattan galleries including Elizabeth Harris Gallery, Kathryn Markel Gallery, Frederieke Taylor Gallery, Frank Mario Gallery, Jon Leon Gallery, Eighth Floor Gallery, Lohin Geduld Gallery and the American Academy of Arts and Letters Invitational Exhibit. He has exhibited his artwork in Washington, Atlanta, San Francisco, Dallas, Charlotte, La Jolla, and Southwest Harbor and Belfast in Maine. His work was shown internationally at the Museum at Rochefort-en-Terre in Brittany, France.

ArtInfo described his paintings as "boldly integrating invented and observed shapes and colors" with his "own lexicon of shapes and lines which he arranges in innovative ways" using a "homemade visual syntax" yielding a "feast of contradictions." During these years he taught at the Rhode Island School of Design as well as Swarthmore College and the Vermont Studio Center. His paintings have appeared in the Hijirizaka Collection in Tokyo, the IBJ Schroder Bank & Trust in New York, and at Brook Partners in Dallas. His paintings are in numerous collections, from the Metropolitan Museum of Art in New York to the Steve Wynn collection in Las Vegas.

Reactions by critics
New York Times critics have described his painting style as a "layered shapes in saturated colors" which were "vibrant, playful, semi-abstract landscapes" which "layers broad, richly colored shapes of trees, rivers and hills into funky, tautly frontal arcadian visions." Paintings had a "mix of Fauvism, Abstract Expressionism and outsider vision.

Art critic John Goodrich of the New York Sun felt Hatton's paintings were less "real" in terms of factual description but they "contain their own peculiar truths, evident in keenly felt colors and designs." Goodrich felt Hatton "finds expression through his forms." Goodrich elaborated:

Critic Ann Landi of ARTnews wrote there was "something endearingly anachronistic about Julian Hatton's abstractions" which had an "unbridled love of pure, hot color," and compared Hatton to Arthur Dove, Georgia O'Keeffe, Paul Gauguin and the Fauvres.

Critic David Ebony in ArtNet in 1996 described Hatton's paintings:

Ebony wrote in 2005 in Art in America that Hatton "experiments with complex and sometimes contradictory spatial relationships" and that his landscapes "consist of Cubist-inspired fractured planes and shifting, multiple perspectives." Critic Joel Silverstein in Reviewny.com suggested Hatton's paintings "sing to each other in a high key citron-like color" and compared him to Paul Gauguin, Miró and Hofmann. He described Hatton as a "lyrical designer" who "abstracts form by promoting visual attractiveness."

Artist Barbara Rothenberg, who teaches art at the Silver Mine Guild Arts Center in New Canaan, Connecticut, and who follows Hatton's career, suggested that Hatton's works were becoming more "abandoned" and that the artist was taking greater "risks"; she likes Hatton's use of the color red.

Critic Hovey Brock writing in The Brooklyn Rail described Hatton's paintings as having a "healthy self-confidence not only in his artistic process, but also in the very enterprise of abstract painting." Critic Peter Malone of Hyperallergic magazine described Hatton's 2019 show entitled Bewilderness as "vigorously overlapping perspectives are pulled into a unified whole made of delightfully unstable parts" that demonstrate a "copious gift for invention, expressed through witty references to flowers, trees, rivers, pathways, and other landscape elements."

Awards and grants
 1992–MacDowell Residency Fellowship
 1993–National Endowment for the Arts, Washington, D.C.
 1995–Rochefort-en-Terre, Art Colony Fellowship, Brittany, France
 1998–New York Foundation for the Arts Fellowship in Painting
 2001–Pollock-Krasner Grant in Painting
 2007–Award in Art, American Academy of Arts and Letters

See also
 Landscape painting
 Abstract expressionism
 Fauvism
 American modernism

References

External links
 Artist's website
 Artist's paintings online

1956 births
American abstract artists
Modern painters
20th-century American painters
American male painters
21st-century American painters
21st-century American male artists
American landscape painters
Living people
Harvard University alumni
Artists from Michigan
Painters from New York City
People from Grand Haven, Michigan
20th-century American male artists